The Generations of Noah, also called the Table of Nations or Origines Gentium, is a genealogy of the sons of Noah, according to the Hebrew Bible (Genesis ), and their dispersion into many lands after the Flood, focusing on the major known societies. The term nations to describe the descendants is a standard English translation of the Hebrew word "goyim", following the  400 CE Latin Vulgate's "nationes", and does not have the same political connotations that the word entails today.

The list of 70 names introduces for the first time several well-known ethnonyms and toponyms important to biblical geography, such as Noah's three sons Shem, Ham and Japheth, from which 18th century German scholars at the Göttingen School of History derived the race terminology Semites, Hamites and Japhetites. Certain of Noah's grandsons were also used for names of peoples: from Elam, Ashur, Aram, Cush, and Canaan were derived respectively the Elamites, Assyrians, Arameans, Cushites, and Canaanites. Likewise, from the sons of Canaan: Heth, Jebus, and Amorus were derived Hittites, Jebusites, and Amorites. Further descendants of Noah include Eber – from Shem (from whom come the "Hebrews"); the hunter-king Nimrod – from Cush; and the Philistines – from Misrayim.

As Christianity spread across the Roman Empire, it carried the idea that all people were descended from Noah. But the tradition of Hellenistic Jewish identifications of the ancestry of various peoples, which concentrates very much on the Eastern Mediterranean and the Ancient Near East (described below), became stretched and its historicity questioned. Not all Near Eastern people were covered, and Northern European peoples important to the Late Roman and Medieval world, such as the Celtic, Slavic, Germanic, and Nordic peoples were not covered, nor were others of the world's peoples, such as sub-Saharan Africans, Native Americans, and peoples of Central Asia, the Indian subcontinent, the Far East, and Australasia. Scholars derived a variety of arrangements to make the table fit, with for example the Scythians, which do feature in the tradition, being claimed as the ancestors of much of northern Europe.

Table of Nations
On the family pedigrees contained in the biblical pericope of Noah, Saadia Gaon (882‒942) wrote: 
The Scriptures have traced the patronymic lineage of the seventy nations to the three sons of Noah, as also the lineage of Abraham and Ishmael, and of Jacob and Esau. The blessed Creator knew that men would find solace at knowing these family pedigrees, since our soul demands of us to know them, so that [all of] mankind will be held in fondness by us, as a tree that has been planted by God in the earth, whose branches have spread out and dispersed eastward and westward, northward and southward, in the habitable part of the earth. It also has the dual function of allowing us to see the multitude as a single individual, and the single individual as a multitude. Along with this, man ought to contemplate also on the names of the countries and of the cities [wherein they settled]."

Maimonides, echoing the same sentiments, wrote that the genealogy of the nations contained in the Law has the unique function of establishing a principle of faith, how that, although from Adam to Moses there was no more than a span of two-thousand five hundred years, and the human race was already spread over all parts of the earth in different families and with different languages, they were still people having a common ancestor and place of beginning.

Book of Genesis

Chapters 1–11 of the Book of Genesis are structured around five toledot statements ("these are the generations of..."), of which the "generations of the sons of Noah, Shem, Ham, and Japheth" is the fourth. Events before the Genesis flood narrative, the central toledot, correspond to those after: the post-Flood world is a new creation corresponding to the Genesis creation narrative, and Noah had three sons who populated the world. The correspondences extend forward as well: there are 70 names in the Table, corresponding to the 70 Israelites who go down into Egypt at the end of Genesis and to the 70 elders of Israel who go up the mountain at Sinai to meet with God in Exodus. The symbolic force of these numbers is underscored by the way the names are frequently arranged in groups of seven, suggesting that the Table is a symbolic means of implying universal moral obligation. The number 70 also parallels Canaanite mythology, where 70 represents the number of gods in the divine clan who are each assigned a subject people, and where the supreme god El and his consort, Asherah, has the title "Mother/Father of 70 gods", which, due to the coming of monotheism, had to be changed, but its symbolism lived on in the new religion.

The overall structure of the Table is:
1. Introductory formula, v.1
2. Japheth, vv.2–5
3. Ham, vv.6–20
4. Shem, vv.21–31
5. Concluding formula, v.32.

The overall principle governing the assignment of various peoples within the Table is difficult to discern: it purports to describe all humankind, but in reality restricts itself to the Egyptian lands of the south, the Mesopotamian lands, and Anatolia/Asia Minor and the Ionian Greeks, and in addition, the "sons of Noah" are not organized by geography, language family or ethnic groups within these regions. The Table contains several difficulties: for example, the names Sheba and Havilah are listed twice, first as descendants of Cush the son of Ham (verse 7), and then as sons of Joktan, the great-grandsons of Shem, and while the Cushites are North African in verses 6–7 they are unrelated Mesopotamians in verses 10–14.

The date of composition of Genesis 1–11 cannot be fixed with any precision, although it seems likely that an early brief nucleus was later expanded with extra data. Portions of the Table itself 'may' derive from the 10th century BCE, while others reflect the 7th century BCE and priestly revisions in the 5th century BCE. Its combination of world review, myth and genealogy corresponds to the work of the Greek historian Hecataeus of Miletus, active c.520 BCE.

Book of Chronicles
I Chronicles 1 includes a version of the Table of Nations from Genesis, but edited to make clearer that the intention is to establish the background for Israel. This is done by condensing various branches to focus on the story of Abraham and his offspring. Most notably, it omits Genesis 10:9–14, in which Nimrod, a son of Cush, is linked to various cities in Mesopotamia, thus removing from Cush any Mesopotamian connection. In addition, Nimrod does not appear in any of the numerous Mesopotamian King Lists.

Book of Jubilees

The Table of Nations is expanded upon in detail in chapters 8–9 of the Book of Jubilees, sometimes known as the "Lesser Genesis," a work from the early Second Temple period. Jubilees is considered pseudepigraphical by most Christian and Jewish denominations but thought to have been held in regard by many of the Church Fathers. Its division of the descendants throughout the world are thought to have been heavily influenced by the "Ionian world map" described in the Histories of Herodotus, and the anomalous treatment of Canaan and Madai are thought to have been "propaganda for the territorial expansion of the Hasmonean state".

Septuagint version
The Hebrew bible was translated into Greek in Alexandria at the request of Ptolemy II, who reigned over Egypt 285–246 BCE. Its version of the Table of Nations is substantially the same as that in the Hebrew text, but with the following differences:
 It lists Elisa as an extra son of Japheth, giving him eight instead of seven, while continuing to list him also as a son of Javan, as in the Masoretic text. 
 Whereas the Hebrew text lists Shelah as the son of Arpachshad in the line of Shem, the Septuagint has a Cainan as the son of Arpachshad and father of Shelah – the Book of Jubilees gives considerable scope to this figure. Cainan appears again at the end of the list of the sons of Shem.
 Obal, Joktan's eighth son in the Masoretic text, does not appear.

1 Peter 
In the First Epistle of Peter, 3:20, the author says that eight righteous persons were saved from the Great Flood, referring to the four named males, and their wives aboard Noah's Ark not enumerated elsewhere in the Bible.

Sons of Noah: Shem, Ham and Japheth

The Genesis flood narrative tells how Noah and his three sons Shem, Ham, and Japheth, together with their wives, were saved from the Deluge to repopulate the Earth.
 Shem's descendants: Genesis chapter 10 verses 21–30 gives one list of descendants of Shem. In chapter 11 verses 10–26 a second list of descendants of Shem names Abraham and thus the Arabs and Israelites. In the view of some 17th-century European scholars (e.g., John Webb),  the Native American peoples of North and South America, eastern Persia and "the Indias" descended from Shem, possibly through his descendant Joktan. Some modern creationists identify Shem as the progenitor of Y-chromosomal haplogroup IJ, and hence haplogroups I (common in northern Europe) and J (common in the Middle East).

 Ham's descendants: The forefather of Cush, Egypt, and Put, and of Canaan, whose lands include portions of Africa. The Aboriginal Australians and indigenous people of New Guinea have also been tied to Ham. The etymology of his name is uncertain; some scholars have linked it to terms connected with divinity, but a divine or semi-divine status for Ham is unlikely.
 Japheth's descendants: His name is associated with the mythological Greek Titan Iapetus, and his sons include Javan, the Greek-speaking cities of Ionia. In Genesis 9:27 it forms a pun with the Hebrew root yph: "May God make room [the hiphil of the yph root] for Japheth, that he may live in Shem's tents and Canaan may be his slave."

Based on an old Jewish tradition contained in the Aramaic Targum of pseudo-Jonathan ben Uzziel, an anecdotal reference to the Origines gentium in  has been passed down, and which, in one form or another, has also been relayed by Josephus in his Antiquities, repeated in the Talmud, and further elaborated by medieval Jewish scholars, such as in works written by Saadia Gaon, Josippon, and Don Isaac Abarbanel, who, based on their own knowledge of the nations, showed their migratory patterns at the time of their compositions:

"The sons of Japheth are Gomer, and Magog, and Madai, ( - British) and Javan, and Tuval, and Meshech and Tiras, while the names of their diocese are Africa proper, and Germania, and Media, and Macedonia, and Bithynia, and Moesia (var. Mysia) and Thrace. Now, the sons of Gomer were Ashkenaz, and Rifath and Togarmah,According to R. Saadia Gaon (1984:32 - note 9), some of Togarmah's descendants settled in Tadzhikistan in central Asia. Jonathan ben Uzziel, who rendered an Aramaic translation of the Book of Ezekiel in the early 1st-century CE, wrote that Togarmah in Ezekiel 27:14 is the province of Germamia (var. Germania), suggesting that his descendants had originally settled there. The same view is taken by the author of the Midrash Rabba (Genesis Rabba §37). while the names of their diocese are Asia, and Parthia and the ‘land of the barbarians.’ The sons of Javan were Elisha, and Tarshish, Kitim and Dodanim, while the names of their diocese are Elis, and Tarsus, Achaia and Dardania." ---Targum Pseudo-Jonathan on Genesis 10:2–5

"The sons of Ḥam are Kūš, and Miṣrayim, and Fūṭ (Phut), and Kenaʻan, while the names of their diocese are Arabia, and Egypt, and Elīḥerūq and Canaan. The sons of Kūš are Sebā and Ḥawīlah and Savtah and Raʻamah and Savteḫā, [while the sons of Raʻamah are Ševā and Dedan]. The names of their diocese are called Sīnīrae, and Hīndīqī, Samarae, Lūbae, Zinğae, while the sons of Mauretinos are [the inhabitants of] Zemarğad and [the inhabitants of] Mezağ." ---Targum Pseudo-Jonathan on Genesis 10:6–7

"The sons of Shem are Elam, and Ashur, and Arphaxad, and Lud, and Aram. [And the children of Aram are these: Uz, and Hul, and Gether, and Mash.] Now, Arphaxad begat Shelah (Salah), and Shelah begat Eber. Unto Eber were born two sons, the one named Peleg, since in his days the [nations of the] earth were divided, while the name of his brother is Joktan. Joktan begat Almodad, who measured the earth with ropes; Sheleph, who drew out the waters of rivers; and Hazarmaveth, and Jerah, and Hadoram, and Uzal, and Diklah, and Obal, and Abimael, and Sheba, and Ophir, and Havilah, and Jobab, all of whom are the sons of Joktan.” ---Targum Pseudo-Jonathan on Genesis 10: 22–28

Problems with identification
Because of the traditional grouping of people based on their alleged descent from the three major biblical progenitors (Shem, Ham, and Japheth) by the three Abrahamic religions, in former years there was an attempt to classify these family groups and to divide humankind into three races called Caucasoid, Mongoloid, and Negroid (originally named "Ethiopian"), terms which were introduced in the 1780s by members of the Göttingen School of History. It is now recognized that determining precise descent-groups based strictly on patrilineal descent is problematic, owing to the fact that nations are not stationary. People are often multi-lingual and multi-ethnic, and people sometimes migrate from one country to another - whether voluntarily or involuntarily. Some nations have intermingled with other nations and can no longer trace their paternal descent, or have assimilated and abandoned their mother's tongue for another language. In addition, phenotypes cannot always be used to determine one's ethnicity because of interracial marriages. A nation today is defined as "a large aggregate of people inhabiting a particular territory united by a common descent, history, culture, or language." The biblical line of descent is irrespective of language, place of nativity, or cultural influences, as all that is binding is one's patrilineal line of descent. For these reasons, attempting to determine precise blood relation of any one group in today's Modern Age may prove futile. Sometimes people sharing a common patrilineal descent spoke two separate languages, whereas, at other times, a language spoken by a people of common descent may have been learnt and spoken by multiple other nations of different descent.

Another problem associated with determining precise descent-groups based strictly on patrilineal descent is the realization that, for some of the prototypical family groups, certain sub-groups have sprung forth, and are considered diverse from each other (such as Ismael, the progenitor of the Arab nations, and Isaac, the progenitor of the Israelite nation, although both family groups are derived from Shem's patrilineal line through Eber. The total number of other sub-groups, or splinter groups, each with its distinct language and culture is unknown.

Ethnological interpretations

Identifying geographically-defined groups of people in terms of their biblical lineage, based on the Generations of Noah, has been common since antiquity.

The early modern biblical division of the world's "races" into Semites, Hamites and Japhetites was coined at the Göttingen School of History in the late 18th century – in parallel with the color terminology for race which divided mankind into five colored races ("Caucasian or White", "Mongolian or Yellow", "Aethiopian or Black", "American or Red" and "Malayan or Brown").

Extrabiblical sons of Noah
There exist various traditions in post-biblical and talmudic sources claiming that Noah had children other than Shem, Ham, and Japheth who were born before the Deluge.

According to the Quran (Hud 42–43), Noah had another unnamed son who refused to come aboard the Ark, instead preferring to climb a mountain, where he drowned. Some later Islamic commentators give his name as either Yam or Kan'an.

According to Irish mythology, as found in the Annals of the Four Masters and elsewhere, Noah had another son named Bith who was not allowed aboard the Ark, and who attempted to colonise Ireland with 54 persons, only to be wiped out in the Deluge.

Some 9th-century manuscripts of the Anglo-Saxon Chronicle assert that Sceafa was the fourth son of Noah, born aboard the Ark, from whom the House of Wessex traced their ancestry; in William of Malmesbury's version of this genealogy (c. 1120), Sceaf is instead made a descendant of Strephius, the fourth son born aboard the Ark (Gesta Regnum Anglorum).

An early Arabic work known as Kitab al-Magall "Book of Rolls" (part of Clementine literature) mentions Bouniter, the fourth son of Noah, born after the flood, who allegedly invented astronomy and instructed Nimrod. Variants of this story with often similar names for Noah's fourth son are also found in the c. fifth century Ge'ez work Conflict of Adam and Eve with Satan (Barvin), the c. sixth century Syriac book Cave of Treasures (Yonton), the seventh century Apocalypse of Pseudo-Methodius (Ionitus), the Syriac Book of the Bee 1221 (Yônatôn), the Hebrew Chronicles of Jerahmeel, c. 12th–14th century (Jonithes), and throughout Armenian apocryphal literature, where he is usually referred to as Maniton; as well as in works by Petrus Comestor c. 1160 (Jonithus), Godfrey of Viterbo 1185 (Ihonitus), Michael the Syrian 1196 (Maniton), Abu al-Makarim c. 1208 (Abu Naiţur); Jacob van Maerlant c. 1270 (Jonitus), and Abraham Zacuto 1504 (Yoniko). 

Martin of Opava (c. 1250), later versions of the Mirabilia Urbis Romae, and the Chronica Boemorum of Giovanni de' Marignolli (1355) make Janus (the Roman deity) the fourth son of Noah, who moved to Italy, invented astrology, and instructed Nimrod.

According to the monk Annio da Viterbo (1498), the Hellenistic Babylonian writer Berossus had mentioned 30 children born to Noah after the Deluge, including Macrus, Iapetus Iunior (Iapetus the Younger), Prometheus Priscus (Prometheus the Elder), Tuyscon Gygas (Tuyscon the Giant), Crana, Cranus, Granaus, 17 Tytanes (Titans), Araxa Prisca (Araxa the Elder), Regina, Pandora Iunior (Pandora the Younger), Thetis, Oceanus, and Typhoeus. However, Annio's manuscript is widely regarded today as having been a forgery.

Historian William Whiston stated in his book A New Theory of the Earth that Noah, who is to be identified with Fuxi, migrated with his wife and children born after the deluge to China, and founded Chinese civilization.

See also

Notes

References

Bibliography 

  (an English translation published in 2016, by the Golan Abarbanel Research Institute)
 (first printed in 1930)
 
 (reprinted in Westport Conn. 1981)

 
 
 
 
 
 
 
 
 
 

 
 
 
 
 (reprinted in 1978)
 
 
 
  (quoted in )
  (reprinted from London 1896)
 

 
 
 
 
 
 
 
 
 

 
 
 
 
 
 
 (First printed in 1903, Based on British Museum add. 27031)
 
 
 
 

 (section 5, note 13) (This work, published in 429 CE, is a recension of Yu Huan's Weilue ("Brief Account of the Wei Dynasty"), the original having now been lost)

External links
 Jewish Encyclopedia: Entry for "Genealogy"

Bible genealogy
 
Noah
Noach (parashah)
Nimrod
Genealogy
Phoenicians in the Hebrew Bible
Book of Jubilees